The  was the invasion of northern Kyūshū by Jurchen pirates in 1019.

History
At the time, Toi (Doe) meant "barbarian" in the Korean language. The Toi pirates sailed with about 50 ships from direction of Goryeo, then assaulted Tsushima and Iki, starting 27 March 1019. After the Iki Island garrison consisting of 147 soldiers led by Fujiwara Notada was wiped out, the Jurchen pirates slaughtered all the Japanese men while seizing Japanese women as prisoners. Fujiwara Notada, the Japanese governor was killed. 

After that, they raided Chikuzen Province's Ido, Shima, and Sawara counties, and on April 9, they raided Hakata. For a week, using  in the Hakata Bay as a base, they sacked villages and kidnapped over 1000 Japanese, mostly women and young girls, for use as slaves. The Dazaifu, the administrative center of Kyūshū, then raised an army and successfully drove the pirates away. 

After that, they then raided Matsuura County, Hizen Province from April 13 to May 20, and were eventually repelled by Genchi, the founder of the "Matsuura 48 Parties", and after attacking Tsushima again, they retreated towards the Korean Peninsula.

A few months later, the Goryeo delegate Jeong Jaryang reported that the Goryeo navy had intercepted the pirates off of Weonsan and eliminated them. They rescued around 300 Japanese captives. Under Korean captivity "they were provided white clothes and fed meals with silverware". The Korean government then repatriated them back to Japan where they were thanked by the Dazaifu and given rewards. There remain detailed reports by two captive women, Kura no Iwame and Tajihi no Akomi, with Kura no Iwame's report being copied down.

The Japanese children and women kidnapped by the Jurchens were mostly likely forced to become prostitutes and sex slaves. Only 270 or 259 Japanese on 8 ships were returned when Goryeo managed to intercept them. 1280 Japanese were taken prisoner, 374 Japanese were killed and 380 Japanese owned livestock were killed for food.

These Jurchen pirates lived in what is today Hamgyŏngdo, North Korea.

Traumatic memories of the Jurchen raids on Japan, the Mongol invasions of Japan in addition to Japan viewing the Jurchens as "Tatar" "barbarians" after copying China's barbarian-civilized distinction, may have played a role in Japan's antagonistic views against Manchus and hostility towards them in later centuries such as when the Tokugawa Ieyasu viewed the unification of Manchu tribes as a threat to Japan. The Japanese mistakenly thought that Hokkaido (Ezochi) had a land bridge to Tartary (Orankai) where Manchus lived and thought the Manchus could invade Japan. In 1627, The Tokugawa shogunate sent a message to Joseon via Tsushima offering help to Joseon against the Later Jin invasion of Joseon. Joseon refused it.

References 

 Timeline (includes information on Toi invasion)

Invasions
Invasions of Japan
Jurchen history
Piracy in the Pacific Ocean
Wars involving Japan
Conflicts in 1019
1010s in Japan
1019 in Asia